Primary Road No. 15 was a state highway in western Iowa.  It is related to the current highways:

U.S. Highway 169 between the Missouri state line and Winterset
Iowa Highway 92 between Winterset and near Bevington
Iowa Highway 28 between near Bevington and Des Moines
U.S. Highway 69 between Des Moines and the Minnesota state line

P015
U.S. Route 169
U.S. Route 69